The American Civics Test (also known as the American Citizenship Test, U.S. Civics Test, U.S Citizenship Test, and U.S. Naturalization Test) is an oral examination that is administered to immigrants who are applying for U.S. citizenship. The test is designed to assess the applicants' knowledge of U.S. history and government. US Citizenship and Immigration Services (USCIS) administers the test as part of the naturalization process.

History 
The Basic Naturalization Act, passed by Congress on June 29, 1906, established the Bureau of Immigration and Naturalization, which oversaw national standardization of citizenship procedures. Prior to the 1906 law, naturalization was under the jurisdiction of the courts (municipal, county, state, or federal), where petitioners could go to the most convenient location and procedures varied. Because there was no explicit requirement to administer a test on American civics as part of the naturalization process, testing was left to the judge's discretion.

During the Bureau of Naturalization's early years of operation, concerns were raised about immigrants being denied citizenship due to a lack of knowledge of American civics and history, so the bureau established education programs to combat the problem, but no standardized test or testing procedure was developed. As a result, courts continued to administer tests with no specific list of questions. The history of the test questions is difficult to document as they were given orally and were usually impromptu.

However, reforms were implemented in 1933 by the newly consolidated Immigration and Naturalization Service (INS). Rather than memorizing simple trivial facts, changes were made to ensure that test takers had a meaningful understanding of US history and civics. Years later, on March 1, 2003, the United States Citizenship and Immigration Services (USCIS) was established and took over all responsibility for immigration service functions previously managed by the INF. Following a thorough investigation, it was discovered that the INS lacked standard test content, instruments, protocols, and even a scoring system for the naturalization process. Although the INS began combating these issues in 2001, the Department of Homeland Security suggested reforms to the citizenship test procedures under the newly established USCIS in 2005. The current version of the civics exam became a requirement of the naturalization process on October 1, 2008.

Naturalization

Testing procedures 
The civics test is part of the naturalization process for applicants seeking US citizenship. The test is prepared in English and is administered orally by a USCIS officer who asks up to 10 of the 100 civics questions. Special considerations are given to applicants who demonstrate need. The questions cover a wide range of topics, including the principles of American democracy, the functions of the different branches of government, and the rights and responsibilities of U.S. citizens.

The test questions are in 3 major categories. However, in addition to the categories stated below, the 2008 version also includes an Integrated Civics category:

American Government

 Principle of American Government,
 System of Government,
 Rights and Responsibilities

American History:

 Colonial Period and Independence
 1800s
 Recent American History and Other Important Historical Information

Symbols and Holidays:

 Symbols
 Holidays

Over recent years, two types of tests were made:

Civics test (2008 version) 
The 2008 civics test is an oral exam, and the USCIS officer will ask up to 10 questions from a list of 100 civics test questions. To pass the 2008 civics exam, applicants must correctly answer six questions.

Civic test (2020 version) 
The 2020 civics test is an oral exam, and  the USCIS officer will ask up to 20 of the 128 civics test questions. To pass the 2020 civics exam, applicants must correctly answer at least 12 questions.

Due to recent policy changes, knowing which exam will be administered is dependent on when the application was submitted. Applicants who submitted their applications on or after December 1, 2020, and before March 1, 2021, with an interview scheduled before April 19, 2021, may have the option to take the 2008 or 2020 test version.

Accommodations

65/20 special consideration 
If the applicant is 65 years old or older and has been living in the United States as a lawful permanent resident of the United States for 20 or more years, they may only study for 20 select questions marked with an asterisk. They may also take the civics test in the language of their choice.

Disability waiver 
Applicants seeking naturalization are expected to be literate in the English language as well as understand the fundamental principles of the history and government of the United States. Applicants with physical, developmental, and/or mental disabilities that last 12 months or more may be exempt from this requirement by completing a medical exemption form provided by USCIS. Only a medial doctor is and can only can verify and certify the information on the form.

Controversy 
On December 1, 2020, USCIS adopted a revised version of the 2008 civics test. This came after a decennial review during President Donald Trump's administration. The revised 2020 version increased the number of questions while making the wording more difficult for English learners. Many of the standards and accommodations were also modified, such as raising the application fee and expanding requirements for disabled applicants. To that end, immigration organizations warned that the test revision would make it harder for poor immigrants from non-English-speaking countries to become voting citizens. Although a copy of the test and its answers are made available online, advocates worry about more disparaged applicants' ability understand more nuanced questions. Critics of the new test believe it is designed to add an unnecessary barrier to naturalization. However, this policy has been reversed in compliance with an executive order signed by President Joe Biden on February 2, 2021, which reinstates the 2008 civics test as the standard basis for all test questions.

Resources and initiatives

USCIS study guides 
USCIS provides free study materials which includes sample test question of both the 2020 and 2008 civics test version, although the 2008 version is in use within interviews.  The agency is currently exploring ways to revamp the civics test, with the help of national engagements for feedback and comments on the proposed changes. The test will go through a trial phase for about five months in 2023. In the meantime, applicants preparing for the civics test should study the questions in accordance with the current policy applicable to their application case.

American civics in education 
In January 2015, Arizona became the first state in the United States to require high school students to pass a civics test before graduation. The law, signed by Governor Doug Ducey, requires high school students to correctly answer 60 of 100 questions on a test similar to the one new citizens must pass during naturalization. Governor Ducey believes that requiring the civics test in schools would improve civic and political engagement in the country. Advocates like the Arizona-based Joe Foss Institute have set a goal of having all 50 states pass similar legislation by 2017, the 230th anniversary of the United States Constitution. However, only 20 states had followed suit as of 2019.

References 

Citizenship tests
Citizenship of the United States